The 2011–12 Azerbaijan Premier League (known as the Unibank Premyer Liqası for sponsorship reasons) was the twentieth season of the Premier League since its establishment in 1992. Neftchi Baku was the defending champions, having won their second Azerbaijani championship the previous season.

A total of twelve teams participated in the league, the ten sides remaining of the 2010–11 season, one promoted club from the 2010–11 Azerbaijan First Division and a totally new club instead of defunct First Division champions FC Absheron. The format of the league was same as 2010–11 season.

There is only one change in season's regulation as only champion of 2011–12 Azerbaijan First Division was directly promoted, while runners up of first division played play-off game with the team that finished 11th in Azerbaijan Premier League.

Teams
MOIK Baku were relegated to the Azerbaijan First Division after finishing 12th and last, at the end of last season. They were replaced by First Division champions FC Absheron and runners-up Ravan Baku. However, due sponsorship problems Absheron became defunct and replaced by Sumgayit City F.C.

On 31 May 2011, it was announced that FK Ganja changed their name to FC Kəpəz. On 18 July 2011, FK Mughan also ruled out to participate in this season due sponsorship reasons and replaced by Simurq PFC.

Stadia and locations

Personnel and sponsoring

Managerial changes

Season events

Inter Baku scandal
On 21 August 2011, Inter Baku - FK Baku game was suspended during last minutes due referee scandal, therefore game's fate decided after Professional Football League of Azerbaijan's decision. On 23 August 2011, PFL awarded 3-0 technical victory to FK Baku and announced the following punishments were given to Inter Baku's individuals: 
Georgi Nikolov, club's chairman: 5 game ban from football and fined 5,000 AZN.
Kakhaber Tskhadadze: fined 1,000 AZN.
Giorgi Lomaia: 2 game ban and fined 2,000 AZN.
Furthermore, Inter Baku fined additional 13,000 AZN for breaching security regulations.

Khazar Lankaran and Turan controversy
On 6 August 2011, the Disciplinary Committee of AFFA imposed the punishment on the scandal that took place in two matches. Khazar Lankaran fined 10,000 AZN after club's fans threw alien objects to the court, injuring the head of Inter Baku's coach Kakhaber Tskhadadze. Khazar also must play its next two league home matches in an empty stadium because of its fans' aggressive behavior.

AFFA fined Turan Tovuz 26,000 AZN and moved its next two league home matches on a neutral ground for injuring referees, breaking PFL camera as well as for refusing to play at the second half of 2011–12 Azerbaijan Cup. The club's president Musa Suleymanov has been disqualified for five matches and club received technical defeat of 0-3.

First round

League table

Results

Second round

Championship group
The top six teams of the first phase participate in this group, which will decide which team will win the championship. Additionally, teams in this group compete for one 2012–13 Champions League and two Europa League spots.

The winners will qualify for the Champions League Second qualifying round, with the runners-up and third place team earning a spot in the Europa League first qualifying round.

Table

Results

Relegation group
The bottom six teams of the first phase will determine the teams to be relegated to the 2012–13 Azerbaijan First Division. The bottom team of this group will be directly relegated, while the fifth-placed team will have to compete in relegation/promotion playoffs with the second-placed teams of the 2011–12 Azerbaijan First Division. On April 30, due decision of Association of Football Federations of Azerbaijan, no clubs from Azerbaijan First Division will be promoted which means all clubs from this season will be remaining in the league.

Table

Results

Season statistics

Top scorers

Last updated: 11 May 2012
Source: Azerbaijan Premier League

Hat-tricks

Scoring

 First goal of the season: John Pelu for Ravan Baku against Kəpəz (6 August 2011)
 Fastest goal of the season: 1st minute, 
Shahin Karimov for Kəpəz against AZAL (11 September 2011)
Dejan Rusič for Khazar Lankaran against Kəpəz (16 December 2011)
 Latest goal of the season: 90+4 minutes, 
Ramazan Abbasov for Ravan Baku against Simurq (19 August 2011)
Akif Taghiyev for Turan Tovuz against Simurq (25 August 2012)
 Largest winning margin: 6 goals
Neftchi Baku 7–1 AZAL(11 December 2012)
 Highest scoring game: 9 goals
AZAL 6–3 Sumgayit(7 March 2012)
 Most goals scored in a match by a single team: 7 goals
Neftchi Baku 7–1 AZAL(11 December 2012)
 Most goals scored in a match by a losing team: 3 goals
AZAL 6–3 Sumgayit(7 March 2012)

Clean sheets

 Most clean sheets: 17 
Inter Baku
 Fewest clean sheets: 4
Kəpəz

Discipline

 Most yellow cards (club): 82
AZAL
 Most yellow cards (player): 12
Vidas Alunderis (Simurq)
 Most red cards (club): 7
Inter Baku
Ravan Baku
Kəpəz
 Most red cards (player): 3
Tagim Novruzov (Ravan Baku)

Awards

Monthly awards

Annual awards

See also
2011–12 Azerbaijan First Division
2011–12 Azerbaijan Cup
List of Azerbaijan football transfers summer 2011
List of Azerbaijan football transfers winter 2012

References

2011–12 in European association football leagues
2011-12
1